Rana Dasgupta (born 5 November 1971 in Canterbury, England) is a British Indian novelist and essayist. He grew up in Cambridge, England, and studied at Balliol College, Oxford, the Conservatoire Darius Milhaud in Aix-en-Provence, and, as a Fulbright Scholar, the University of Wisconsin–Madison. In 2010 The Daily Telegraph called him one of Britain's best novelists under 40. In 2014 Le Monde named him one of 70 people who are making the world of tomorrow. Among the prizes won by Dasgupta's works are the Commonwealth Prize and the Ryszard Kapuściński Award.

Dasgupta is a former Literary Director of the JCB Prize for Literature.

Career
Dasgupta's first novel, Tokyo Cancelled (HarperCollins, 2005), was an examination of the forces and experiences of globalisation. Billed as a modern-day Canterbury Tales, it is about thirteen passengers stuck overnight in an airport who tell thirteen stories from different cities in the world, stories that resemble contemporary fairytales, mythic and surreal. The tales add up to a broad exploration of 21st-century forms of life, which includes billionaires, film stars, migrant labourers, illegal immigrants and sailors. Tokyo Cancelled was shortlisted for the 2005 John Llewellyn Rhys Prize.

Dasgupta's second novel, Solo (HarperCollins, 2009), was an epic tale of the 20th and 21st centuries told from the perspective of a 100-year-old Bulgarian man. Having achieved little in his 20th-century life, he settles into a long and prophetic daydream of the 21st century, where all the ideological experiments of the old century are over, and a collection of startling characters – demons and angels – live a life beyond utopia. A reviewer described it as "unfazed by the 21st century, confidently tracing the wrong turnings of the past 100 years, soaring insightfully over the mess of global developments that constitute the quagmire of today". Solo was translated into twenty languages.

Dasgupta was awarded the prestigious Commonwealth Writers' Prize for the novel Solo; it won both the region and overall best-book prize.

His third book, Capital: A Portrait of Twenty-First-Century Delhi (Canongate, 2014), is a non-fiction exploration of his adopted city of Delhi, and, in particular, the changes and personalities brought about there by globalization. Capital won the Ryszard Kapuściński Award and was shortlisted for the Orwell Prize and the Ondaatje Prize.

Dasgupta is currently working on a book about a proposed crisis of the nation-state system. In March 2017 he co-curated a major conference and exhibition at the Haus der Kulturen der Welt in Berlin with the title "Now is the time of monsters: what comes after nations?"

He served as the founding Literary Director of the JCB Prize for Literature founded in 2018 by JCB which will be awarded annually with 25 lakh Indian rupees (US$38,400) to a distinguished work of fiction by an Indian writer.
Dasgupta was awarded the prestigious Rabindranath Tagore Literary Award 2019 for his novel Solo.

Academic appointments

In October 2012, Dasgupta was Whitney J. Oates Visiting Fellow in the Humanities at Princeton University.

Since 2014, he has taught each spring at Brown University where he is Distinguished Visiting Lecturer and Writer-in-Residence in the Department of Modern Culture and Media.

Awards
 2010 Commonwealth Writers' Prize for Best Book for his novel Solo
 2017 Émile Guimet Prize for Asian Literature for Capital
 2017 Ryszard Kapuściński Award for Capital
 2019 Rabindranath Tagore Literary Prize for Solo

Bibliography

Fiction
Tokyo Cancelled (2005)
Solo (2009)

Non-fiction
Capital: A Portrait of Twenty-First Century Delhi (2014).

Essays
"Maximum Cities" (New Statesman, 27 March 2006)
"Capital Gains" (Granta 107, Summer 2009)
"Writing into the unknown" (Nagledna+, 2013)
"Notes on a Suicide" (Granta 140, Summer 2017) 
"The Demise of the Nation State" (The Guardian, The long read, 5 April 2018)
"The Silenced Majority: Can America Still Afford Democracy?" (Harper's Magazine 341, no. 2,047 December 2020, pages 47–56)

Further reading 

 Mendes, AC, Lau, L. (2018) “The conjunctural spaces of ‘new India’: Imagined geographies of 2010s India in representations by returnee migrants”, cultural geographies, 1–16. DOI: 10.1177/1474474018786033.
 Mendes, AC. (2018) “The eruption and ruination of ‘rising India’: Rana Dasgupta’s Capital and the temporalities of Delhi in the 2010s”, Modern Asian Studies, 1–25. DOI: 10.1017/S0026749X17000464.

References

External links
 New Statesman article by Rana Dasgupta on the rise of the Third-World city
 Granta essay by Rana Dasgupta about Delhi's new rich
 "Rana Dasgupta", Writers Online, Brown University.

1971 births
Living people
People from Canterbury
People from Cambridge
21st-century British novelists
Alumni of Balliol College, Oxford
British male novelists
British people of Indian descent
People educated at The Perse School
University of Wisconsin–Madison alumni
21st-century British male writers